Renato Machado (born 21 March 1943 in Rio de Janeiro) is a Brazilian newscaster and journalist

From 1996 to 2011 he was the editor-in-chief and anchorman of Bom Dia Brasil ("Good Morning Brazil"). He also served, from 1982 to 1983, as the presenter of Jornal da Globo.

References

1943 births
Brazilian journalists
Male journalists
People from Rio de Janeiro (city)
Living people